Sibanda is a Nguni and Sotho family name

Notable people with the surname include:

Karabo Sibanda, Botswana Sprinter
Jabulani Sibanda former Chairman of the Rhodesian War Veterans Association
Gibson Sibanda, founding Vice President of the Movement for Democratic Change
Felix Magalela Mafa Sibanda, politician and MP of MDC
Vusi Sibanda, Rhodesian cricketer

References

Zimbabwean surnames
Surnames of African origin